Beinn Bheula is a mountain located between Loch Goil and Loch Eck. It is part of the Arrochar Alps range. Beinn Bheula appears rugged from Lochgoilhead, with several summits, the highest of which is Caisteal Dubh (Gaelic for black castle). It is commonly climbed from Loch Goil

References

Corbetts
Mountains and hills of the Southern Highlands
Marilyns of Scotland
Mountains and hills of Argyll and Bute